Bruce J. Schulman is an American historian, currently the William E. Huntington Professor at Boston University. From 2022-23, Schulman served as the Harmsworth Visiting Professor of American History at The Queen's College, Oxford.

According to his faculty profile, Schulman is writing the "volume for the Oxford History of the United States covering the years 1896-1929."

Background
Schulman received a BA in History from Yale University in 1981. He received an MA and PhD in History from Stanford University in 1982 and 1987 respectively.

Academic career
Schulman was appointed as an Assistant Professor of History at the University of California, Los Angeles in July 1987. He left UCLA in December 1993 and joined Boston University as a Professor of History in January 1994. From June 1997 to September 2002 Schulman served as the director of the American and New England Studies program at the university. From January 2010 to July 2013 he chaired the university's History Department.

Schulman currently directs the Institute for American Political History at Boston University. He was appointed the Huntington Professor of History in July 2008.

Recognition
While at UCLA in 1993 Schulman won the Charles and Harriet Luckman Distinguished Teaching Award and the Eby Award for the Art of Teaching. In 2006 Schulman received the Nancy Lyman Roelker Mentorship Award from the American Historical Association for his doctoral supervision.

Books
 From Cotton Belt to Sunbelt: Federal Policy, Economic Development, and the Transformation of the South, 1938–1980 (Oxford University Press, 1991)
 Lyndon B. Johnson and American Liberalism: A Brief Biography with Documents (Bedford Books of St. Martin's Press, 1994)
 The Seventies: The Great Shift in American Culture, Politics, and Society (Free Press, 2001)

References

External links

Year of birth missing (living people)
Living people
Boston University faculty
21st-century American historians
21st-century American male writers
Yale University alumni
Stanford University alumni
American male non-fiction writers